Barák is a Czech surname. Notable people with the surname include:

Antonín Barák (born 1994), Czech professional footballer
Josef Barák (1833–1883), Czech politician, journalist, and poet
Jindřich Barák (born 1991), Czech ice hockey player

Czech-language surnames